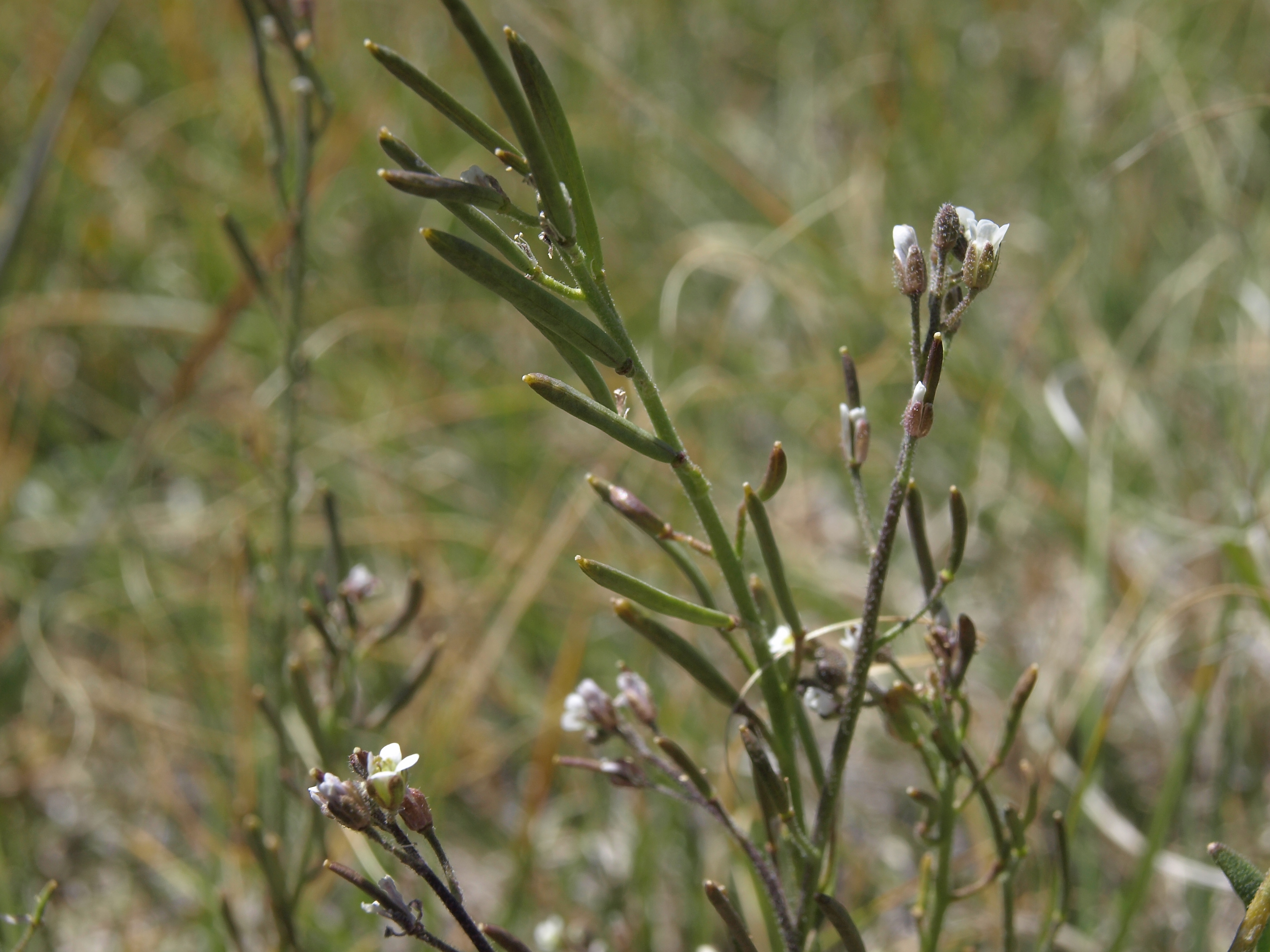
- Transberingia virgata

Scientific classification
- Kingdom: Plantae
- Clade: Tracheophytes
- Clade: Angiosperms
- Clade: Eudicots
- Clade: Rosids
- Order: Brassicales
- Family: Brassicaceae
- Genus: Transberingia; Al-Shehbaz & O'Kane

Species
- Transberingia bursifolia (DC.) Al-Shehbaz & O'Kane; Transberingia virgata (Nutt.) N.H. Holmgren

Synonyms
- Beringia R.A.Price, Al-Shehbaz & O'Kane, 2001

= Transberingia =

Genus of flowering plants

Transberingia is a genus of plants found in Russia, Greenland, and North America. It is in the family Brassicaceae.
